An Tairbeart (Scottish Gaelic, 'crossing' or 'isthmus') may refer to the following places in Scotland:

 several places called Tarbet
 several places called Tarbert
Tarbat, a civil parish in the east of Ross and Cromarty, Scotland